A kinoform is a type of converging lens that is able to efficiently focus x-ray radiation. They can be used to study nanomaterials. Diamond is often used in kinoform lenses as it has a high thermal conductivity. They are also used in holography.

Further reading
A.F. Isakovic, A. Stein, J.B. Warren, S. Narayanan, M. Sprung, A.R. Sandy, K. Evans-Lutterodt, "Diamond Kinoform Hard X-ray Refractive Lenses: Design, Nanofabrication and Testing," J. Synch. Rad., 16, 8 (2009).

References

X-rays